Acleris lucipeta is a species of moth of the family Tortricidae. It is found in India (Sikkim) and China (Yunnan).

References

Moths described in 1966
lucipeta
Moths of Asia